There are two species of snake named neotropical snail-eater:
 Dipsas bucephala
 Dipsas cisticeps
 Dipsas indica